Edenspiekermann is a design and marketing agency with offices in Amsterdam, Berlin, San Francisco, Los Angeles and Singapore. The company is the result of a merger in 2009 between Eden design & communication (Amsterdam) and SpiekermannPartners (Berlin), founded by German typographer Erik Spiekermann.

History 
Edenspiekermann is the result of several mergers and collaborations between design and architectural firms over the past decades.

Premsela Vonk: 1956 - 1986 
In 1956 Benno Premsela and Jan Vonk started a collaboration. Premsela worked at De Bijenkorf where he remained Head of Publicity and Shop Windows until 1963.

BRS: 1969 - 1986 
In 1969, graphic designers Jan Brinkman and Niko Spelbrink started their collaboration. Guus Ros joined the duo in 1971 and from then on, they continued their cooperation as Brinkman, Ros en Spelbrink. Edo Smitshuijzen joined in 1975 when Niko Spelbrink went to London for one year. The BRS acronym wasn't introduced until 1980 when John Stegmeijer joined the company as 5th partner.

BRS Premsela Vonk: 1986 - 1999 
In 1986, Premsela Vonk merged with BRS.

E.D.E.N. European Designers Network: 1989 - 1999 
In 1989 BRS Premsela Vonk formed the European Designers Network E.D.E.N. EESV, together with Metadesign (Berlin), King & Miranda Design (Milan) and Eleven Danes (Copenhagen).

Eden Design & Communication: 1999 - 2009 
In 1999, BRS Premsela Vonk merged with Linea, specialised in information design and forms design, and DC3, specialised in interaction design.

United Designers Network and SpiekermannPartners: 2002–2009 
Erik Spiekermann left Metadesign in 2001 to run his own projects, forming the United Designers Network in 2002-3 with American designer, Susanna Dulkinys. Changing the name to SpiekermannPartners in 2007.

Edenspiekermann: 2009 – present 
In January 2009, SpiekermannPartners and Eden Design & Communication merged to form Edenspiekermann. Between 2009 and 2017, Edenspiekermann opened new offices in Stuttgart, San Francisco, Los Angeles, and Singapore.

Further reading
Listed by date
Erler, J. (2014). "Hello I am Erik". Berlin: Die Gestalten Verlag. 
Swesinger, B. (2010). The Form Book: Best Practice in Creating Forms for Printed and Online Use.. London: Thames and Hudson. 
Shaoqiang, W. (Eds.). (2009). 100% European Graphic Design Portfolio.. HangZhou: Page One. 
Peeters, R. (2008). Merkdesign. Een ruwe diamant in merkenland. Amsterdam: Stichting Wetenschappelijk Onderzoek Communicatie. 
Ruyssenaars, B. (Eds.). (2008). European Business Design 1: Top creative solutions for today's business challenges. Amsterdam: BIS Publishers. 
Capsule. (2007). Design Matters: Logos 01: an essential primer for today's competitive market. Gloucester: Rockport Publishers.  
Swesinger, B. (2007). Formulare Gestalten: Das Handbuch. Verlag Hermann Schmidt Mainz.  Formulare Gestalten
Gianotten, H. (2004, maart/april). Huisstijl Amsterdam. Items, 78-82.
Spijkerman, P. (Eds.). (2003). De vorm van de overheid. Nuth: Drukkerij Rosbeek. 
Smitshuijzen, E., de Waard, J. (1995). Bewegwijzering in Nederland: Dutch Sign Design. Amsterdam: BIS Publishers.

References

External References
www.edenspiekermann.com

Design